Ettore Reynaudi (4 November 1895 – June 1968) was an Italian footballer who played as a midfielder. He competed for Italy in the men's football tournament at the 1920 Summer Olympics.

References

External links
 

1895 births
1968 deaths
Italian footballers
Italy international footballers
Olympic footballers of Italy
Footballers at the 1920 Summer Olympics
People from Novara
Association football midfielders
Novara F.C. players
Juventus F.C. players
A.C. Monza players
A.C. Monza managers
Footballers from Piedmont
Sportspeople from the Province of Novara